New Dawn (El Fedjr El Jadid) is a nationalist and conservative political party in Algeria established in 2012.

History and profile
The party was established in 2012. Its political ideology is nationalist and conservative, and its president is Tahar Benbaïbeche.

In the 2012 elections, the party received 1.74% of the votes and won five seats in the Parliament. It is among opposition parties in the Parliament.

The party supported the 2020 Algerian constitutional referendum.

Electoral results

Legislative elections

Council of the Nation elections

References

2012 establishments in Algeria
Algerian nationalism
Conservative parties in Algeria
Nationalist parties in Algeria
Political parties established in 2012
Political parties in Algeria